Shahzadeh Mohammad (also Romanized as Shāhzādeh Moḩammad) is a village in Heruz Rural District, Kuhsaran District, Ravar County, Kerman Province, Iran. At the 2006 census, its population was 247, in 71 families.

References 

Populated places in Ravar County